Mary Collins may refer to:
 Mary Collins (First Lady of Boston) (1920–2010)
 Mary Collins (politician) (born 1940), Canadian politician
 Mary Collins (missionary) (1846–1920), American who worked among the Sioux
 Mary Call Darby Collins (1911–2009), widow of Governor LeRoy Collins and First Lady of Florida from 1955 to 1961
 Mary Collins (immunologist), British immunologist at University College London
 Mary Collins (psychologist), psychology lecturer at Edinburgh University
 Mary Teresa Collins, Irish Traveller abuse survivor and activist

 Mary Lou Collins, a fictional character on the American television series The Larry Sanders Show

 Bo Derek (born Mary Cathleen Collins in 1956), American actress

See also
 Collins (surname)